Ishteryakovo (İştiräk) is a rural locality (a village) in Karabashevsky Selsoviet, Ilishevsky District, Bashkortostan, Russia. The population was 492 as of 2010. There are 7 streets.

Geography 
Ishteryakovo is located 14 km southwest of Verkhneyarkeyevo (the district's administrative centre) by road. Karabashevo is the nearest rural locality.

References 

Rural localities in Ilishevsky District